Edward Wilby (18 May 1922 – February 1998) was an English professional footballer who played as a full back.

Career
Born in Rotherham, Wilby signed for Bradford City from Wolverhampton Wanderers in September 1946. He made 3 league appearances for the club, before being released in 1947.

Sources

References

1922 births
1988 deaths
English footballers
Wolverhampton Wanderers F.C. players
Bradford City A.F.C. players
English Football League players
Association football fullbacks